Donji Dušnik is a village situated in Gadžin Han municipality in Serbia.

References

External links

Populated places in Nišava District